Dr. Moheb Ramzi Stino was the Minister of Tourism and Aviation for Egypt under Anwar Sadat.  His brother, Dr. Kamal Stino, was Vice-Prime Minister under Nasser. His other brother, Charles Stino, was the vice Minister of Industry, under Nasser.

References

Egyptian people of Coptic descent
Coptic politicians
Living people
Tourism ministers of Egypt
Year of birth missing (living people)
Civil Aviation ministers of Egypt

nl:Kamal Stino#Familie